The 2014 Quito Challenger was a professional tennis tournament played on clay courts. It was the 20th edition of the tournament which was part of the 2014 ATP Challenger Tour. It took place in Quito, Ecuador between 15 and 21 September 2014.

Singles main-draw entrants

Seeds

 1 Rankings are as of September 8, 2014.

Other entrants
The following players received wildcards into the singles main draw:
  Chase Buchanan
  Julio César Campozano
  Gonzalo Escobar
  David Konstantinov

The following player entered into the singles main draw with a protected ranking:
  Miguel Ángel Reyes-Varela
 
The following players received entry from the qualifying draw:
  Marcelo Arévalo 
  Iván Endara 
  Facundo Mena 
  André Miele

Champions

Singles

 Horacio Zeballos def.  Nicolás Jarry, 6–4, 7–6(11–9)

Doubles

 Marcelo Demoliner /  João Souza def.  Duilio Beretta /  Martín Cuevas, 6–4, 6–4

External links
Official Website

 
Quito Challenger
Quito Challenger
Quito Challenger